The 1985 European Women Basketball Championship, commonly called EuroBasket Women 1985, was the 20th regional championship held by FIBA Europe. The competition was held in Italy and took place from 8 September to 15 September 1985.  won the gold medal and  the silver medal while  won the bronze.

Squads

First stage

Group A

Group B

Play-off stages

Final standings

External links 
 FIBA Europe profile
 Todor66 profile

 
1985
1985 in Italian women's sport
International women's basketball competitions hosted by Italy
Euro
September 1985 sports events in Europe